The bearded tachuri (Polystictus pectoralis) is a species of bird in the family Tyrannidae.

It is found in Argentina, Bolivia, Brazil, Colombia, French Guiana, Guyana, Paraguay, Suriname, Uruguay, and Venezuela. Its natural habitats are dry savanna and subtropical or tropical seasonally wet or flooded lowland grassland. It is threatened by habitat loss.

Gallery

References

bearded tachuri
Birds of South America
bearded tachuri
Taxa named by Louis Jean Pierre Vieillot
Taxonomy articles created by Polbot